Mount Ephraim is a borough in Camden County, in the U.S. state of New Jersey. As of the 2020 United States census, the borough's population was 4,651, a decrease of 25 (−0.5%) from the 2010 census count of 4,676, which in turn reflected an increase of 181 (+4.0%) from the 4,495 counted in the 2000 census.

The borough had the 20th-highest property tax rate in New Jersey with an equalized rate of 4.442% in 2020, compared to 3.470% in the county as a whole and a statewide average of 2.279%.

History
Mount Ephraim was incorporated as a borough by an act of the New Jersey Legislature on March 23, 1926, from portions of the now-defunct Centre Township. The boroughs of Bellmawr, Runnemede and Lawnside were simultaneously created during the same two-day period. The borough was named for Ephraim Albertson, who owned a tavern in the area in the early 1800s.

In a 1981 decision in Schad v. Mount Ephraim, the U.S. Supreme Court, in a decision authored for the majority by Associate Justice Byron White, the court decided by a 7–2 margin to overturn the convictions of the two owners of a bookstore where there was nude dancing, despite a prohibition against all forms of live entertainment in the borough's zoning ordinance. The decision cited the First Amendment rights of the storeowners.

In January 2014, New Jersey State Senate President Stephen M. Sweeney put forward a proposal which was intended to lower real estate taxes in the state and cut state expenses by merging many of the states 566 municipalities. Mount Ephraim was then the 29th largest town in Camden County, so it is very likely that the town would have been merged with neighboring municipalities to cut costs, share expenses, reduce bureaucracy, share resources, and reduce the burden in the taxpayers and the state itself. Mount Ephraim was formerly part of Centre Township, which included all of the neighboring communities, and it is possible that the name may be used again in the future if the merger proposal goes forward.

Geography
According to the U.S. Census Bureau, the borough had a total area of 0.91 square miles (2.34 km2), including 0.88 square miles (2.29 km2) of land and 0.02 square miles (0.05 km2) of water (2.31%).

Mount Ephraim borders Audubon, Bellmawr, Brooklawn, Gloucester City and Haddon Heights.

Weather
On September 4, 2012, at 6:31 p.m., a tornado touched down in Mount Ephraim, causing damage to trees and homes in the immediate vicinity. It was categorized as F-0 by the National Weather Service, with winds topping out at 70 mph, making it the first tornado recorded in the state in more than a year.

Demographics

2010 census

The Census Bureau's 2006–2010 American Community Survey showed that (in 2010 inflation-adjusted dollars) median household income was $61,331 (with a margin of error of +/− $6,103) and the median family income was $73,955 (+/− $4,630). Males had a median income of $51,049 (+/− $3,914) versus $41,087 (+/− $3,242) for females. The per capita income for the borough was $29,885 (+/− $5,190). About 5.6% of families and 6.8% of the population were below the poverty line, including 9.9% of those under age 18 and 10.4% of those age 65 or over.

2000 census
As of the 2000 United States census, there were 4,495 people and 1,174 families residing in the borough. The racial makeup of the borough was 97.51% White, 0.40% African American, 0.07% Native American, 0.62% Asian, 0.02% Pacific Islander, 0.65% from other races, and 0.73% from two or more races. Hispanic or Latino of any race were 1.98% of the population.

There were 1,818 households, out of which 27.6% had children under the age of 18 living with them, 51.1% were married couples living together, 8.7% had a female householder with no husband present, and 35.4% were non-families. 30.6% of all households were made up of individuals, and 15.5% had someone living alone who was 65 years of age or older. The average household size was 2.46 and the average family size was 3.13.

In the borough, the population was spread out, with 22.3% under the age of 18, 7.1% from 18 to 24, 30.1% from 25 to 44, 22.5% from 45 to 64, and 17.9% who were 65 years of age or older. The median age was 40 years. For every 100 females, there were 93.6 males. For every 100 females age 18 and over, there were 93.3 males.

The median income for a household in the borough was $44,824, and the median income for a family was $59,468. Males had a median income of $41,455 versus $30,359 for females. The per capita income for the borough was $21,150. About 2.0% of families and 4.9% of the population were below the poverty line, including 1.7% of those under age 18 and 7.2% of those age 65 or over.

Government

Local government
Mount Ephraim has been governed under the Walsh Act by a three-member commission, since 1935. The borough is one of 30 municipalities (of the 564) statewide that use this form of government. The governing body is comprised of three commissioners, who are elected at-large on a non-partisan basis in elections held as part of the May municipal election to serve concurrent terms of office. Each commissioner is assigned a department to oversee as part of their elected service and a mayor is selected by the commissioners from the three candidates elected.

, Mount Ephraim's commissioners are 
Mayor Michael "Traz" Tovinsky (Commissioner of Public Works, Parks and Public Property), 
George Gies (Commissioner of Public Affairs and Public Safety) and 
Joseph Wolk (Commissioner of Revenue and Finance), all of whom are serving concurrent terms of office that end May 15, 2023.

Federal, state and county representation
Mount Ephraim is located in the 1st Congressional District and is part of New Jersey's 5th state legislative district.

Politics
As of March 2011, there were a total of 3,110 registered voters in Mount Ephraim, of which 1,402 (45.1%) were registered as Democrats, 403 (13.0%) were registered as Republicans and 1,305 (42.0%) were registered as Unaffiliated. There were no voters registered to other parties.

In the 2012 presidential election, Democrat Barack Obama received 60.7% of the vote (1,278 cast), ahead of Republican Mitt Romney with 37.7% (793 votes), and other candidates with 1.7% (35 votes), among the 2,131 ballots cast by the borough's 3,320 registered voters (25 ballots were spoiled), for a turnout of 64.2%. In the 2008 presidential election, Democrat Barack Obama received 58.6% of the vote (1,334 cast), ahead of Republican John McCain, who received around 37.6% (855 votes), with 2,275 ballots cast among the borough's 3,086 registered voters, for a turnout of 73.7%. In the 2004 presidential election, Democrat John Kerry received 58.8% of the vote (1,309 ballots cast), outpolling Republican George W. Bush, who received around 39.9% (888 votes), with 2,228 ballots cast among the borough's 2,982 registered voters, for a turnout percentage of 74.7.

In the 2013 gubernatorial election, Republican Chris Christie received 62.9% of the vote (753 cast), ahead of Democrat Barbara Buono with 35.9% (430 votes), and other candidates with 1.3% (15 votes), among the 1,222 ballots cast by the borough's 3,353 registered voters (24 ballots were spoiled), for a turnout of 36.4%. In the 2009 gubernatorial election, Democrat Jon Corzine received 47.3% of the vote (621 ballots cast), ahead of both Republican Chris Christie with 42.7% (560 votes) and Independent Chris Daggett with 6.2% (81 votes), with 1,312 ballots cast among the borough's 3,127 registered voters, yielding a 42.0% turnout.

Education
The Mount Ephraim Public Schools serve students in pre-kindergarten through eighth grade. As of the 2018–19 school year, the district, comprised of two schools, had an enrollment of 413 students and 38.0 classroom teachers (on an FTE basis), for a student–teacher ratio of 10.9:1. Schools in the district (with 2018–19 enrollment data from the National Center for Education Statistics) are 
Mary Bray Elementary School with 240 students in grades Pre-K–4 and 
Raymond W. Kershaw Middle School with 162 students in grades 5–8.

For ninth through twelfth grades, public school students attend Audubon High School, in Audubon, as part of a sending/receiving relationship with the Audubon School District. As of the 2018–19 school year, the high school had an enrollment of 804 students and 66.5 classroom teachers (on an FTE basis), for a student–teacher ratio of 12.1:1.

Transportation

Roads and highways

Interstate 76 passes through Mount Ephraim, with part of the interchange with Interstate 295 located within the borough.

Public transportation
Mount Ephraim is served by two NJ Transit bus lines. Service between the borough and Philadelphia is available on the 400 route, with local service on the 457 route between the Moorestown Mall and Camden.

Notable people

People who were born in, residents of, or otherwise closely associated with Mount Ephraim include:

 Dan Baker (born 1946), Philadelphia Phillies PA Announcer and former Philadelphia Eagles PA Announcer
 Bobby Clarke (born 1949), former Philadelphia Flyers hockey team captain and general manager
 Edith Fore, TV commercial actress for Life Alert, "I've fallen and I can't get up"
 Ben Vaughn, singer, songwriter, musician, record producer, composer for television / film, and syndicated radio show host

References

External links
 
 Mount Ephraim Borough website
 Mount Ephraim Public Schools
 
 School Data for the Mount Ephraim Public Schools, National Center for Education Statistics

 
1926 establishments in New Jersey
Boroughs in Camden County, New Jersey
Populated places established in 1926
Walsh Act